KARS may refer to:

 KARS (gene), a human gene
 KARS-FM, a radio station (102.9 FM) licensed to Laramie, Wyoming, United States
 KJFA (AM), a radio station (860 AM) licensed to Belen, New Mexico, United States, which held the call sign KARS from 1961 to 2017
 Kuwait Amateur Radio Society

See also
 Kars (disambiguation)
 CARS (disambiguation)